Mary Dodge may refer to:
Mary Abigail Dodge (1833–1896), American writer and essayist who wrote under pseudonym Gail Hamilton
Mary Mapes Dodge (1831–1905), American children's writer and editor, best known for her novel Hans Brinker
Mary Melissa Hoadley Dodge (1861–1934), American heiress who moved to England